Mother Brain is the main antagonist in the Metroid video game series, and the crossover fiction Captain N: The Game Master cartoon show based on it. Other characters of this name include:

A villain in the video game Chrono Trigger
The main antagonist of the video game Phantasy Star II